The Hanover Bridge is a historic metal pin-connected Pratt through truss bridge spanning the Crow River between Hanover and Rogers, Minnesota, United States, on the border of Wright and Hennepin Counties.  It is the second-oldest Pratt truss bridge remaining in Minnesota.  The Hanover Bridge was listed on the National Register of Historic Places in 1979 for having local significance in the themes of engineering and transportation.  It was nominated as a well-preserved example of a bridge type once common in Wright County.

Construction
The Hanover Bridge was built in 1885 by the Morse Bridge Company of Youngstown, Ohio. The company later changed its name to the Youngstown Bridge Company, and merged into the American Bridge Company in 1900. Its wooden deck was replaced in 1965 in a style similar to the original.

Weight limitations
The bridge carried traffic until December 1966, although its weight limit was rather low.  Children riding school buses to school would have to get off on one side and walk across the bridge, and then the bus would slowly drive across and pick up the students on the other side.

Although the bridge was later replaced by a modern concrete structure  to the west, the old bridge is in use as a pedestrian bridge.  Hanover citizens renovated the bridge in the 1980s.  Additional rehabilitation work was completed in 2004.

See also
 List of bridges on the National Register of Historic Places in Minnesota
 National Register of Historic Places listings in Hennepin County, Minnesota
 National Register of Historic Places listings in Wright County, Minnesota

References

External links
 Hanover Bridge (Bridge 92366)–Minnesota Department of Transportation

Bridges completed in 1885
Bridges in Hennepin County, Minnesota
Buildings and structures in Wright County, Minnesota
Former road bridges in Minnesota
National Register of Historic Places in Hennepin County, Minnesota
National Register of Historic Places in Wright County, Minnesota
Pedestrian bridges in Minnesota
Road bridges on the National Register of Historic Places in Minnesota
Transportation in Wright County, Minnesota
Metal bridges in the United States
Pratt truss bridges in the United States